Michael George Wilson (born October 30, 1952 in Portland, Jamaica) is songwriter and musician living in Norristown, Pennsylvania. He was formerly most known for being an important part of Burning Spear's comeback during the late 1970s through the early 1980s.

Discography
Farover (1982)
Fittest of the Fittest (1983)

References
Burningspear.com

Jamaican reggae musicians
Living people
1952 births
People from Portland Parish